Basilica is a genus of moths of the family Noctuidae.

References

External links 

Natural History Museum Lepidoptera genus database

Hadeninae